Stephen Barber is an American composer, arranger and musician, known for working with David Byrne, Keith Richards, John Legend, Natalie Merchant, T Bone Burnett, Rosanne Cash, The London Symphony Orchestra, Christopher Cross, Bonnie Raitt, Indigo Girls, Michael Stipe and Shawn Colvin.

Early life

Barber was born April 6, 1952, in Abilene, Texas, to Carolyn Grisham Barber, a pianist and music teacher, and Harwell Barber, a businessman and philanthropist. His cousin is the author John Grisham, and his godfather is flamenco guitarist Jim Jennings. Barber started playing the piano at the age of three, began playing guitar at eleven and started writing music at the age of twelve. At fifteen, Barber went to Sewanee Military Academy in Tennessee, where he was the only student studying music theory. He attended summer school in 1971 at the University of Texas to study music composition, then attended Southwest Texas State University, where he studied music composition under composer Russell Riepe.

Career

In 1974, Barber began a friendship with Gideon Waldrop, the Dean of Juilliard, however passed up an invitation to attend Juilliard at that time. He was in a band with Eric Johnson called The Electromagnets from 1974–1976 and in 1977, Barber moved to New York City, reconvened with Dean Waldrop, began monitoring classes at Juilliard and was accepted to study music composition and orchestration privately with John Corigliano. He was the keyboardist and arranger for Christopher Cross from 1983–1988 and during that time composed thirteen original scores for Shelley Duvall's Faerie Tale Theatre, under the direction of Van Dyke Parks. He was nominated for an ACE award for the episode, "3 Little Pigs". In the early 1990s, Barber composed for the BBC's National Geographic Explorer with David Attenborough and Mike Salisbury under the direction of producer Michael deGruy. In 1996, he began a mentorship with Joe Zawinul, and in the late 1990s he toured again with Eric Johnson. In 2001, Barber became a founder and artistic director of the Barbwire Music Project, an Austin, TX based non-profit commissioning, presenting and educational organization for contemporary American music. In 2004, he was inducted into the Austin Music Awards Hall of Fame. In 2011, he released his album, Astral Vinyl, on Navona Records. Barber currently resides in Austin, TX.

Selected works

In total, Barber has worked on more than 170 album projects and multiple television and movie scores.
 2014	Natalie Merchant – Natalie Merchant – String Arrangements, Woodwind Arrangement
 2014	United States – Ian McLagan – String Arrangements
 2013	Fourth Corner	– Trixie Whitley – String Arrangements
 2012	Ludwig Senfl: All Ding ein Weil – La Caccia – Instrument Design
 2011  Stephen Barber: Astral Vinyl – Composer, Piano
 2011	Bon Voyage: Music by Giovanni – Paolo Foscarini – The Foscarini Experience – Guitar Maker
 2011	Red Hot + Rio 2 – Composer, producer, String Arrangements
 2011	Rockpango – Los Lonely Boys – Composer, String Arrangements, String Writing
 2010	Comfort in the Static – Kenny White – String Arrangements
 2010	July Flame – Laura Veirs – String Arrangements
 2010	Leave Your Sleep – Natalie Merchant – Arranger, Orchestration, String Arrangements
 2010	The Best of Shawn Colvin – Shawn Colvin – Arranger
 2010	When Everything Breaks Open – Matt Morris – String Arrangements, String Conductor
 2009	Au Pres de Vous: French Chansons of the 16th Century – Mignarda – Instrument Design
 2008	Live with the Tosca Strings – Terry Bozzio – Piano, Primary Artist
 2008	Never Say Never – Ian McLagan – Arranger, String Arrangements
 2007	I Am – Chrisette Michele – String Arrangements
 2007	Join the Parade – Marc Cohn – String Arrangements
 2007	Papito – Miguel Bosé – Guest Artist 
 2007	Remembered – Ted Greene – Keyboards
 2007	The Sky Observer's Guide – Amy Cook – String Arrangements, Strings
 2006	In the Footsteps of Herman Hollanders – Instrument Design
 2006	Once Again – John Legend – String Arrangements
 2006	Travesías – Susana Baca – Orchestration
 2006	Un'altra Canzone – Instrument Design
 2005	Cannonball – Mark David Manders – Organ (Hammond)
 2005	From the Five – Stephen Bruton – Composer, Hammond B3, Main Personnel, Organ (Hammond), Pump Organ, Wurlitzer
 2005	Live from Austin TX – Eric Johnson – Composer
 2005	Live from Austin TX [DVD] – Eric Johnson – Composer
 2005	Patch of Blue – Dee Carstensen – Arranger, producer
 2005	The Rainbow Bear – Stephen Barber – Primary Artist
 2004	13 Ways to Live – Composer, Guitar (Electric), Piano
 2004	Boompa, Vol. 1 – Composer
 2004	Get Lifted – John Legend – String Arrangements
 2004	Grown Backwards – David Byrne – Arranger, Horn Arrangements, Prepared Piano
 2004	Por Vida: A Tribute to the Songs of Alejandro Escovedo – Composer
 2004	Salt – Arto Lindsay – Keyboards, String Arrangements, Violin Arrangement
 2003	The Order – David Torn – Score Orchestration
 2002	Divine Secrets of the Ya-Ya Sisterhood – Conductor, leader, String Arrangements
 2002	Invoke – Arto Lindsay – Clarinet, Guitar, Horn Arrangements, Keyboards, Organ, Violin Arrangement
 2002	Long Way Around: An Anthology 1991–2001 – Chris Whitley – Keyboards, Piano
 2002	Spirit World – Stephen Bruton – Composer, Organ, Piano, Synthesizer
 2001	A Man Under the Influence – Alejandro Escovedo – Composer
 2001	L' Instant d'Apres – David Linx – Arranger
 2001	Motherland – Natalie Merchant – Arranger, Conductor
 2001	Rocket House – Chris Whitley – Arranger, Jaw Harp, Keyboards, Percussion, Piano, Programming, Synthesizer Bass
 2001	Wait for Me – Jubilant Sykes – Arranger, Orchestra
 2001	Whole New You – Shawn Colvin – String Arrangements
 2000	Passenger – Tara MacLean – String Arrangements
 2000	Q – Mr. Children – String Arrangements
 1999	An American Diary, Vol. 2: The Dreamings – Mike Mainieri – Arranger, producer
 1999	Iean-Pavle Paladin: Tablatvre De Lvth – Lute
 1999	Nothing But the Truth – Stephen Bruton – Composer, Keyboards, Piano, producer
 1999	This Is Life – Curiously Strong – Organ (Hammond), Piano, String Arrangements
 1998	Little Ship – Loudon Wainwright III – String Arrangements
 1997	G3: Live in Concert – Joe Satriani – Keyboards
 1997	Merry Axemas: A Guitar Christmas	 – Arranger, Composer, Keyboards, Synthesizer
 1996	Anxiety of Influence – Meridian Arts Ensemble – Composer
 1996	Baby Sleep – Lute
 1996	Venus Isle – Eric Johnson – Composer
 1996	With These Hands – Alejandro Escovedo – Arranger, composer, Farfisa Organ, Keyboards, Organ (Hammond), Piano, Piano (Electric), Prepared Piano, String Arrangements, Synthesizer, Wurlitzer
 1996	Zawinul: Stories of the Danube – Joe Zawinul – Assistant
 1995	Every Second Counts – Jim Lauderdale – Keyboards
 1995	Right on Time	– Stephen Bruton – String Arrangements
 1993	Monteverdi: Madrigali Concertati – Tragicomedia – Guitar Maker
 1992	The Hunter – Jennifer Warnes – Arranger, Synclavier
 1990	Ah Via Musicom – Eric Johnson – Keyboards, Synthesizer
 1990	Beth Nielsen Chapman – Beth Nielsen Chapman – Arranger, Associate Producer
 1990	Crimes of the Heart – Ute Lemper – Associate Producer
 1989	N.Y.C. – Steps Ahead – Orchestration
 1987	Famous Blue Raincoat: The Songs of Leonard Cohen – Jennifer Warnes	– String Arrangements
 1986	Tones – Eric Johnson – Arranger, composer, Fairlight, Fairlight CMI, Keyboards, Piano, Synthesizer
 1975	Electromagnets – Electromagnets – Clarinet, composer, Keyboards, Piano, Piano (Electric), Synthesizer, Vocals, composer

Film and television

 2015 The Teller and the Truth – Composer
 2014 Road to Austin (Documentary) – Composer
 2013 Looking For Mr Stieglitz (Short) – Composer
 2007 Midway Through the Journey – short film by Dan Polsby – Composer 
 2006 Last Best Hope (Documentary) – Composer
 2005 Rendezvous to Freedom – (PBS) – Composer
 2005 The Last Days of the San Jose – Composer
 2004 World Without Waves – Composer: additional music/Musician 
 2002 Divine Secrets of the Ya-Ya Sisterhood – Composer
 1993 Son in Law – Writer: "Bled Me Dry"
 1992 Galaxies Are Colliding – Music producer
 1991 The Human Shield – Composer 
 1988 Nature – "Hawaii: Islands of the Fire Goddess" – Composer
 1987 No Retreat, No Surrender 2 – Composer: additional music/orchestrator
 1986 Popples – Composer
 1986 Tall Tales & Legends – "Pecos Bill", "Davy Crockett", "Casey at the Bat" Episodes – Composer
 1984–1985 Faerie Tale Theatre – 13 episodes including "The Emperor's New Clothes" (1985), "The Three Little Pigs" (1985), "Goldilocks and the Three Bears" (1984) – Composer

References

Living people
1952 births
American male composers
21st-century American composers
21st-century American male musicians